Fuzuli is a city and the capital of the Fuzuli District of Azerbaijan.

The city had a population of 17,090 before its capture by Armenian forces on 23 August 1993, during the First Nagorno-Karabakh War, which resulted in the expulsion of the local Azerbaijani population and the city becoming a ghost town.

On 17 October 2020, Azerbaijani forces recaptured the city during the 2020 Nagorno-Karabakh war.

History

Russian rule 
Fuzuli was known as Qarabulaq until 1827 when it was renamed to Karyagino. It was administrated as part of Dzhebrail Uyezd during the Russian Empire. The city later became the administrative center of the uezd ("county"), with the latter being eponymously renamed Karyaginsky Uyezd (pre-reform Russian: Карягинскій уѣздъ). According to the 1915 publication of the Caucasian Calendar, Karyagino had a population of 400 in 1914, mostly Russians.

The town was renamed to Füzuli in 1959. During the Soviet years, the city was the administrative centre of the Füzuli raion of Azerbaijan SSR. According to the 1979 census, 13,091 people lived in the city, of which 87% were Azerbaijanis and 7.4% were Russians and Ukrainians. Population rose to 17,090 in 1989.

Armenian occupation 
During the First Nagorno-Karabakh War, the city was captured by Armenian forces on 23 August 1993. The city subsequently became a ghost town after its capture by Armenian forces and the expatriation of its Azerbaijani population. Subsequently, it was made part of the Hadrut Province of the breakaway Republic of Artsakh and the town was renamed Varanda during its existence. In 2010, the town had a population of 99. It was named after the medieval Armenian melikdom of Varanda, which ruled over the area of what later became Fuzuli.

Recapture by Azerbaijan 
In the context of the 2020 Nagorno-Karabakh war on October 17, 2020, the president of Azerbaijan, Ilham Aliyev stated that the Azerbaijani army had retaken control of the city. The next day, the Azerbaijani Ministry of Defence released a video from Fuzuli showing Azerbaijani soldiers raising the Azerbaijani flag in the centre of the city. On 16 November, Azerbaijani President Ilham Aliyev visited the city and hoisted the Azerbaijani flag on the territory of the former military base of the Armenian forces in Fuzuli.

Reconstruction 
As part of a massive reconstruction project, a new highway is to be built to Shusha via Fuzuli, according to President Aliyev who announced the plan to build during his 16 November 2020 visit to the ruins of the latter town. The process was started with immediate effect, press reports suggesting the new 101 km multi-lane highway should be finished by mid-2022.

On 5 January 2021, Azerbaijani president Ilham Aliyev, announced that an international airport was planned to be built near Fuzuli.  Four days later, the plan for a Fuzuli-Shusha railway was also made public. Fuzuli International Airport was inaugurated on 26 October 2021 by the presidents of Azerbaijan and Turkey.

Notable people 
 Ilyas Afandiyev — writer, Honored Artist of Azerbaijan SSR (1960), People's writer of the Azerbaijan SSR (1979).
 Gara Garayev — National footballer, Azerbaijani Footballer of the Year (2014), currently playing for the domestic Premier League side FK Qarabağ

Gallery

See also 
 Haji Alakbar Mosque

References

External links 

 
 World Gazetteer: Azerbaijan – World-Gazetteer.com

Populated places in Fuzuli District
Ghost towns in Azerbaijan
Ruins in Azerbaijan
Hadrut (province)